Nalla Naal is a 1984 Indian Tamil-language action film directed by  R. Thyagarajan. It stars Vijayakanth and Thiagarajan. The film was released on 1 June 1984.

Plot 

The film tells in a flashback that the father of Chinna Durai is assassinated by the father of Kaali. Chinna Durai takes revenge, kills him and goes to prison leaving his mother and sister to see him leave.

Furious, Kaali promises to kill Chinna Durai on her way out. However, Kaali meets Chinna Durai's sister, Shenbagam. She wraps her heart to marry him knowing the story, that he is looking for Chinna Durai, who is his brother protecting him from murder.

Under the name of Muthu, he gets out of prison and goes to the village to meet his sister. In shock, Muthu did not know she was married to Kaali. Muthu and Kaali become friends under the pretext of another name. Knowing the release date of Chinna Durai, Kaali does not find him in jail. He has a doubt and tries to find him. The ending tells how Chinna Durai and Kaali will associate.

Cast 
Vijayakanth as Chinna Durai (Muthu)
Thiagarajan as Kaali
Nalini as Shenbagam
Viji as Latha
Captain Raju as Pannaiyar
Thengai Srinivasan as Bhai
Jai Ganesh as Kathamuthu
V. Gopalakrishnan as Chinna Durai's father
Senthil
Idichapuli Selvaraj
Jayamalini
Kullamani
K. Natraj

Soundtrack 
The music was composed by Ilaiyaraaja, with lyrics by Vaali.

Reception 
Jayamanmadhan of Kalki wrote .

References

External links 

1980s Tamil-language films
1984 films
Films directed by R. Thyagarajan (director)
Films scored by Ilaiyaraaja